Ingili (translation: Finger) is a 2013 Maldivian experimental suspense thriller film directed by Ravee Farooq. Produced by Ravee Farooq, Hussain Munawwar and Mahdi Ahmed, the film stars  Ismail Rasheed and Abdulla Muaz in pivotal roles. The film was released on 16 May 2013.

Plot
MOOSA (Ismail Rasheed) is a fisherman who anchors at an island he is not familiar with when his boat hits a storm at sea. He finds a remote hut on land where he decides to stay there for the rest of the night until the storm passes away.

But soon his inner fears surface when he starts to realize that he is all by himself at an unknown place. As he spends roaming around the hut unable to sleep, he feels relieved when a stranger named AMMADEY (Abdulla Muaz) appears. Surprisingly, they become fast friends but not before they play couple of pranks on each other.

As their friendship develops, MOOSA begins to learn that AMMADEY is the complete opposite of what he is. AMMADEY is both reckless and fears nothing and carries a small knife for fun.

Unbeknownst to MOOSA, AMMADEY starts a psychological game by exploring the very inner fears of MOOSA. He soon lures MOOSA in to what seems an easy bet that raises more fear and tension inside MOOSA with each passing minute.

Will MOOSA win the bet and getaway with the ultimate price or face the consequences if he loses?

About the story
INGILI is based on 2007 national award-winning short story from under 16 category 'HOLHUASHEEGE EKUVERIYAA' written by MOHAMED HASSAAN who was just 14 years then.

Cast
Ismail Rasheed as Moosa
Abdulla Muaz as Ammaday

Accolades

References

External links
 
 
 INGILI trailer
 Ingili
 Ingili at Schwak Cinema

2013 films
2010s thriller films
Maldivian thriller films
Films directed by Ravee Farooq